Naserabad (also Romanized as Nāşerābād; also known as Nāşīrābād) is a village in Cham Khalaf-e Isa Rural District, Cham Khalaf-e Isa District, Hendijan County, Khuzestan Province, Iran. At the 2006 census, its population was 569, in 110 families.

References 

Populated places in Hendijan County